Annie Hornish (born May 9, 1966) is an American politician who served in the Connecticut House of Representatives from the 62nd district from 2009 to 2011.

Fatal dog mauling 

On November 6, 2019, a 95-year-old woman named Janet D'Aleo was fatally mauled by a dog at the Hornishes' home in Connecticut. The dog was a 4-year-old male pit bull/pointer mix belonging to Annie and her husband, Neil Hornish. D'Aleo was visiting Hornish's mother at the home when the dog bit her on her lower extremities, causing "substantial and severe injuries," Chief Richard Brown said.

Hornish made the following statement: "It seems as if the dog got excited and it was overexuberant...[The dog] jumped on a friend with a walker and she fell backward and we believe that's what killed her."

The dog that fatally mauled D'Aleo was quarantined and is scheduled to be euthanised. The Hornishes have appealed the dog's destruction.

Legal action 

In December 2019, D'Aleo's family filed a lawsuit against the Hornishes, alleging D'Aleo suffered "significant bite wounds and lacerations to her lower extremities, resulting in flesh, muscle and tendon loss; injuries to the nerves, muscles, and soft tissues of her body; and a shock to her entire system." In January 2021, a settlement was agreed upon wherein the Hornishes must pay $2 million to Janet D'Aleo's estate.

References

1966 births
Living people
Democratic Party members of the Connecticut House of Representatives